John Hamilton (died 1757) of Holmpatrick, country Dublin was an Anglo-Irish politician who sat in the Irish House of Commons from 1725 to 1757 and in the British House of Commons from 1728 to 1734.

Hamilton was the second son of Henry Hamilton, of Bailieborough, County Cavan, and his wife Rebecca Blackwell He was the great-grandson of William Bailie, Bishop of Clonfert.
 
Hamilton was returned to the Irish Parliament as Member for Carlow in 1725 and sat until 1727. He was then Member for Dundalk from 1728. He was returned as Member of Parliament for Wendover by a considerable majority at a by-election on 18 March 1728, presumably due to his distant cousin Lord Limerick, the other sitting Member. He was consulted by John Perceval, 1st Earl of Egmont on Irish matters in 1731, when he drafted a petition and bill to allow unenumerated commodities to go direct to Ireland from the colonies, instead of through Great Britain. He supported the Government, voting with them on the army in 1732 and the Excise Bill in 1733. He was proposed as a government candidate for Wendover late in 1733, but did not stand at the 1734 British general election.
   
Hamilton married Miss Ligoe and had one son Henry. His elder brother James Hamilton of Carlow, MP in the Parliament of Ireland was an ancestor of the Lords Holmpatrick.

References

1757 deaths
Year of birth missing
Members of the Parliament of Great Britain for English constituencies
British MPs 1727–1734
Members of the Parliament of Ireland (pre-1801) for County Carlow constituencies
Members of the Parliament of Ireland (pre-1801) for County Louth constituencies
Irish MPs 1715–1727
Irish MPs 1727–1760